Novatron is a trademark referring to one of various products:

2D and 3D machine control products
photographic lighting equipment
the Mellotron keyboard musical instrument
a series of Schmidt video projection monitors developed by Kloss Video Corporation
a trade name of the drug Ondansetron